Southeast Asia Building is a trade magazine based in Singapore, started in 1974. It is published bi-monthly and covers architecture, interior design, landscape architecture, and facility management. 

It caters to readers in Europe, United States, the Southeast Asian region, and in the Middle East, and provides information on current architecture projects, building news, product reviews, market trends, and industry related awards.

References

External links
 
Southeast Asia Building, Company Details at MediaDirectory

1974 establishments in Singapore
Architecture magazines
Bi-monthly magazines
English-language magazines
Magazines established in 1974
Professional and trade magazines
Magazines published in Singapore